George Alfred Jones (1866 – 8 April 1938) was an Australian politician.

He was born in Inverell to schoolmaster Robert Brown and Helen Moore. He married Frances Louisa Durnford around 1891 at Surry Hills; they had three children. A printer, he was president of the Typographical Association from 1897 to 1901, and worked with various newspapers. In 1902 he was elected to the New South Wales Legislative Assembly as the Labor member for Inverell. He transferred to Gwydir in 1904 and served until his defeat in 1913. Jones died at Bondi in 1938.

References

 

1866 births
1938 deaths
Members of the New South Wales Legislative Assembly
Australian Labor Party members of the Parliament of New South Wales